HMS Keppel (F85) was one of a dozen Blackwood-class frigate (also known as the Type 14 class) of second-rate anti-submarine frigates built for the Royal Navy in the 1950s. She was named for Augustus Keppel, who served during the Seven Years' War and was admiral of the Western Squadron during the American War of Independence.

Description
The ships were powered by one English Electric geared steam turbine that drove the single propeller shaft, using steam provided by two Babcock & Wilcox boilers. Their complement was 140 officers and ratings.

The ships were armed with three Bofors 40 mm guns in single mounts. The mount on the quarterdeck was later removed as it was unusable in heavy seas. They were equipped with two triple-barrelled Limbo Mark 10 anti-submarine mortars. The Blackwood-class ships had the same sonar suite as the larger s where the Limbo mortars were controlled by three sonars, the Type 174 search set, Type 162 target-classification set and the Type 170 'pencil beam' targeting set to determine the bearing and depth of the target.

Construction and career
Keppel was laid down by Yarrow Shipbuilders at their Scotstoun shipyard on 27 March 1953, launched on 31 August 1954 and completed on 6 July 1956.

On commissioning, Keppel joined the Second Training Squadron, based at Portland Harbour. She paid off for an extended refit in March 1958, during which her hull was strengthened as a result of operating experience of ships of the class in heavy seas. In September 1960, Keppel returned to the Portland Training Squadron, and from June 1963 to April 1964 served with the Fishery Protection Squadron.

In February 1973, Keppel was reduced to reserve, joining the Standby Squadron at Chatham. She was listed for disposal when a boiler explosion on sister ship , serving with the 2nd Frigate Squadron at Portland, caused Keppel to return to active service to replace Hardy in July 1975. Keppel remained with the 2nd Frigate Squadron, serving in the training role, until November 1976.
 
She was again placed on the disposal list in 1977 and was scrapped at Sittingbourne in 1979.

Notes

Bibliography

 

 

Blackwood-class frigates
1954 ships
Ships of the Fishery Protection Squadron of the United Kingdom